"Beautiful Every Time" is a song recorded by American country music artist Lee Brice. It was released in October 2010 as the second single from his debut album, Love Like Crazy. Brice wrote the song with Rob Hatch and Lance Miller.

Critical reception
Noah Eaton of American Noise gave the song a thumbs down, saying that it "lazily grasps at the most obvious representations encased in contemporary country music for the sole purpose of reaffirming to the listener that this hodge-podge of still-frames from the heartland are 'beautiful every time.'" Kyle Ward of Roughstock gave the song two and a half stars out of five, writing that "the song does an adequate job of using the imagery to convey its point, but the lyrics and production seem to fall short of some of Brice’s previous tracks." Bobby Peacock was more favorable on the same site's review of the album, saying that it was an example of how the album's "songs are strengthened by putting sharp lyrics and arrangements to familiar ideas." He added that "It even manages to hold its theme by leading into an oceanside wedding in the second verse."

Music video
The music video was directed by Eric Welch and premiered in March 2011.

Chart performance
"Beautiful Every Time" debuted at number 59 on the U.S. Billboard Hot Country Songs chart for the week of November 6, 2010.

References

2010 singles
Lee Brice songs
Curb Records singles
Songs written by Lee Brice
Song recordings produced by Doug Johnson (record producer)
Country ballads
Songs written by Rob Hatch
Songs written by Lance Miller
2010 songs